Garden of Happiness is the second studio album by English electronic music duo Grandadbob. It was released in 2006 by Southern Fried Records.

Track listing 

UK Version

 "Come With Me" – 3:43
 "Shake There" – 3:28
 "Pictures" – 4:45
 "Tidal Wave" – 4:40
 "Hide Me" – 4:22
 "Palomino" – 3:14
 "One Day" – 3:37
 "English Summer" – 4:06
 "Garden of Happiness" – 4:07
 "Soul in Your Salad" – 4:31
 "Glow in the Dark" – 4:27
 "Tides" – 24:57

References 

2006 albums